Florent Mothe (born May 13, 1981) is a French singer, actor and musician.

He is most famous for playing the role of Antonio Salieri in Mozart, l'opéra rock. In this role, he performed on a number of singles including Vivre à en crever, l'Assasymphonie, and Le bien qui fait mal.

Biography 
Florent Mothe was born on May 13, 1981 in Argenteuil, Val-d'Oise. He began studying music at the age of 7, at the Montigny-lès-Cormeilles school. He soon learned to play the flute, piano, bass, synthesizer and guitar, but singing was always his primary interest.

He formed his first band, Lost Smile, in 1996, and toured for around six years between France and Germany. At the same time, he played the savant in the musical l'Alphoméga, on the recording and in one performance of the show. Following that, he sang at the Hard Rock Café with his second group, Ouija. He then went to Toronto, where he began a solo career. He performed short concerts in Canadian bars, as well as at the Mod Club in New York.

His performances and recordings on his Myspace page brought him to the attention of Dove Attia and Albert Cohen, producers of Mozart, l'opéra rock, who invited him to attend casting for the musical. He was chosen for the role of Antonio Salieri. In 2010, he was awarded the title of "Francophone Discovery of the year" at the NRJ Music Awards.

His first solo album, Rock in Chair, was released in April 2013. The first single is called Je ne sais pas.

Florent played King Arthur in Dove Attia's new musical La Légende du roi Arthur with David Carreira, Zaho, Camille Lou and Fabien Incardona in 2015.

Discography

Albums

Singles 

with the cast of Mozart, l'opéra rock

with the cast of La Légende du roi Arthur

Awards
2010 NRJ Music Award for "L'Assasymphonie": Francophone Song of the Year 2009
2010 NRJ Music Award as member of the cast of Mozart l'Opéra Rock: Francophone Duo/Group of the Year

References

External links
 Florent Mothe on Myspace

1981 births
Living people
French male musical theatre actors
French male singers